= Prakash Subedi (lyricist) =

Nepali songwriter and lyricist

- प्रकाश सुवेदी
- Born: 4 December 1979 (age 46); Kathmandu, Nepal
- Occupations: Songwriter, lyricist
- Writing career
- Years active: 2006-present

Prakash Subedi (Nepali: प्रकाश सुवेदी) is a Nepali songwriter and lyricist born on 4 December 1979, in Kathmandu, Nepal.

== Music career ==
Subedi began songwriting in 2006. His discography features the songs "Bholi Dekhi Kailai Dekhidaina", "Chhadi Deu Pad Katesi Sattari", "Ashari Lagyo Darkiyo Paani", and "Aaha Kati Sundar Thau". He has been awarded the Himalayan International Award and Rapati National Music Award.

== Awards ==
Year	Awards Title	Award Category	Result	Ref.
2024	4th Himalayan International Award	Best Lyricist	Won	
2022	Rapati National Music Award	Best Lyricist	Won	
2022	Quality Entertainment Award	Best Lyricist	Won	

== Songs ==
Song name	Credit	Ref.
Hunchha Hunchha Bhanda Bhandai	Lyricist	
Mero Bishwo Mero Ghar	Lyricist	
Timilai Yeti Samjhiyachhu	Lyricist	
Jati Maya Lagchha Mamu Ko	Lyricist	
Panauti Sundar Panauti	Lyricist	
Hamro Paryo Rupa	Lyricist	
J Chha Gharmai	Lyricist	
